LLR/EDGE Records, popularly known as EDGE Records, is a Lagos-based music record label jointly established by Ibrahim Okulaja and JahBless. The record label was founded in 2005 with 9ice becoming its first music act in 2006 before the release of his first studio album titled Certificate.

Artists

Current
Reminisce
Ola Dips

Former
9ice

Discography

References

2006 establishments in Nigeria
Record labels based in Lagos
Nigerian record labels
Record labels established in 2006